A rice ball may be any kind of food item made from rice that has been shaped, condensed, or otherwise combined into a ball shape. Rice balls exist in many different cultures in which rice is eaten, and are particularly prevalent in Asia. Rice balls are a convenient and portable food that can be eaten on the go, making them a popular choice for picnics, road trips, and packed lunches. They are also often enjoyed as a snack or side dish with meals.

The rice may be seasoned with a variety of ingredients, such as salt, furikake, or other seasonings, and may also be filled with a variety of fillings, such as fish, meat, or vegetables.

Types of rice balls
Types of rice ball include:

Arancini, an Italian fried rice ball coated with breadcrumbs.
Jumeok-bap, a Korean rice ball from cooked rice formed into oval shapes.
Omo tuo, a Ghanaian staple food that is more smooth and soft due to its higher volume of water, usually eaten with peanut soup.
Onigiri, (お握り), a Japanese rice ball made from white rice formed into triangular or oval shapes.
Pinda, rice balls offered to ancestors during Hindu funeral rites and ancestor worship.
Supplì, an Italian fried rice ball coated with breadcrumbs.
Tangyuan (汤圆), a Chinese rice ball made from glutinous rice flour.
Zongzi, a Chinese rice ball with different fillings and wrapped in bamboo or reed leaves.
Khao tom, a Thai rice ball made with cooked rice and various fillings, wrapped in banana leaves.

Rice dishes